Delusion's Master (1981) is a fantasy novel by British writer  Tanith Lee, the third book in her Tales From The Flat Earth.

External links
 Delusion's Master at GoodReads

1981 British novels
1981 fantasy novels
Novels by Tanith Lee
DAW Books books